Qaleh Zu (also Romanized as Qolleh Zū, Qollehzow, Qollahzow; also known as Qal‘eh Zū and Qal’eh Zow) is a village in Kabud Gonbad Rural District, in the Central District of Kalat County, Razavi Khorasan Province, Iran. At the 2006 census, its population was 1,156, in 302 families.

References 

Populated places in Kalat County